The Sumgayit FK 2016-17 season is Sumgayit's sixth Azerbaijan Premier League season, and seventh season in their history. It is their first full season with Samir Abbasov as manager, during which they will participate in the Azerbaijan Cup as well as the League.

Squad

Transfers

Summer

In:

Out:

Winter

In:

Out:

Friendlies

Competitions

Azerbaijan Premier League

Results summary

Results

League table

Azerbaijan Cup

Squad statistics

Appearances and goals

|-
|colspan="14"|Players who appeared for Zira but left during the season:

|}

Goal scorers

Disciplinary record

References

Azerbaijani football clubs 2016–17 season
Sumgayit FK seasons